Roman Turuşanco (born 13 February 1917, date of death unknown) was a Romanian figure skater. He competed in the men's singles event at the 1936 Winter Olympics.

References

1917 births
Year of death missing
Romanian male single skaters
Olympic figure skaters of Romania
Figure skaters at the 1936 Winter Olympics
Figure skaters from Prague